Ansar Dine ( ʾAnṣār ad-Dīn, also transliterated Ançar Deen; meaning "helpers of the religion" (Islam) also known as Ansar al-Din (abbreviated as AAD) was a Salafi jihadist group led by Iyad Ag Ghaly. Ansar Dine sought to impose absolute sharia across Mali. The group took over the city of Timbuktu in 2012, which prompted the French-led intervention, Operation Serval. 

The organization is not to be confused with the Sufi movement Ançar Dine, founded in Southern Mali in the 1990s by Chérif Ousmane Madani Haïdara, which is fundamentally opposed to militant Islamism. Ansar Dine is opposed to Sufi shrines, and it has destroyed a number of such shrines.

Ansar Dine was active from March 2012 until March 2017, when it merged with other militant Islamist groups to form Jama'at Nasr al-Islam wal Muslimin.

Organization

Membership
Ansar Dine has its main base among the Ifora tribe from the southern part of the Tuaregs' homeland. It has been linked with Al-Qaeda Organization in the Islamic Maghreb (AQIM) because its leader Iyad Ag Ghaly is the cousin of AQIM commander Hamada Ag Hama. In April 2012, Salma Belaala, a professor at Warwick University who does research on jihadism in North Africa said that this association was false, claiming that Ansar Dine was opposed to Al Qaeda. Ag Ghaly was also previously associated with the 1990 Tuareg rebellion. The group's members are reported to come from Mali, Algeria, and Nigeria. Omar Ould Hamaha, who served as Ansar Dine's spokesman after April 2012, became the military leader of the AQIM-affiliated Movement for Oneness and Jihad in West Africa (MOJWA) in August 2012.

On 24 January 2013, a faction which called itself the Islamic Movement for the Azawad split from Ansar Dine. As of January 2013, this group was led by the prominent Tuareg leader Alghabass Ag Intalla.

In March 2013, it was designated as a Foreign Terrorist Organization by the U.S. Department of State, and similarly classed as a terrorist organization by the United Nations Security Council. and Iraq in 2019.

Command structure
In Mopti, the Ansar Dine fighters obtained access to heavy construction equipment from fleeing construction workers and used it to build fighting positions. The fighting positions included an elaborate tunnel network and vehicular obstacles such as trenches.

Weapons

Ansar Dine has reportedly put together at least one convoy of 100 vehicles carrying soldiers equipped with small arms. There have also been rumors that fighters may have been able to obtain weapons from Libya's weapons depots after the fall of Muammar Gaddafi. The Ansar Dine arsenal also includes anti aircraft weapons which can be mounted on pickup trucks.

Ideology
The group seeks to impose sharia law across Mali, including the Azawad region. Witnesses have said that Ansar Dine fighters wear long beards and fly black flags with the shahada (Islamic creed) emblazoned in white. According to different reports, unlike the National Movement for the Liberation of Azawad (MNLA), Ansar Dine does not seek independence but rather to keep Mali intact and convert it into a rigid theocracy.

Participation in 2012 northern Mali conflict

March 2012
On 21 March 2012, the group claimed control of Mali's vast northeast regions. The Agence France-Presse reported that Ansar Dine claimed to occupy the towns of Tinzaouaten, Tessalit, and Aguelhok, all close to the Algerian border, and that they had captured at least 110 civilian and military prisoners. France accused the group of summarily executing 82 soldiers and civilians in capturing Aguelhok, describing the group's tactics as "Al-Qaeda-style".

On 22 March, mutineering Malian soldiers unhappy with Amadou Toumani Touré overthrew the Malian government in a coup d'état. Taking advantage of Malian disarray, Ansar Dine and MNLA proceeded to take the towns of Kidal, Gao, and Timbuktu within the following ten days. According to Jeremy Keenan of the School of Oriental and African Studies, Ansar Dine's military contribution was slight compared to the much larger MNLA: "What seems to happen is that when they move into a town, the MNLA take out the military base—not that there's much resistance—and Iyad [Ag Aghaly] goes into town and puts up his flag and starts bossing everyone around about sharia law".

April 2012
On 3 April, the BBC reported that the group had started implementing Sharia law in Timbuktu. That day, Ag Ghaly gave a radio interview in Timbuktu announcing that Sharia would be enforced in the city, including the veiling of women, the stoning of adulterers, and the punitive mutilation of thieves. According to Timbuktu's mayor, the announcement caused nearly all of Timbuktu's Christian population to flee the city. On 6 April, the MNLA issued a declaration of independence. However, the military wing of Ansar Dine rejected it hours after it was issued.

May 2012
Ansar Dine was reportedly responsible for the burning of the tomb of the Sufi saint Sidi Mahmoud Ben Amar, a World Heritage Site, on 4 May in Timbuktu. The group also blocked a humanitarian convoy bringing medical and food aid from reaching Timbuktu on 15 May, objecting to the presence of women in the welcoming committee set up by city residents; after negotiations, the convoy was released on the following day. In Gao, the group reportedly banned video games, Malian and Western music, bars, and football.

On 26 May, the MNLA and Ansar Dine announced a pact in which they would merge to form an Islamist state called the "Islamic Republic of Azawad".

June 2012
However, some later reports indicated that the MNLA had decided to withdraw from the pact, distancing itself from Ansar Dine. MNLA and Ansar Dine continued to clash, culminating in the Battle of Gao on 27 June, in which Movement for Oneness and Jihad in West Africa and Ansar Dine took control of the city, driving out the MNLA. The following day, Ansar Dine announced that it was in control of all the cities of northern Mali.

July 2012
In the summer of 2012, members of Ansar Dine broke down the doors of the Sidi Yahya Mosque, which, according to legend, were not to be opened until the Last Days. They claimed that reverence for the site was idolatrous, but offered roughly $100 U.S. dollars to repair the mosque.

November 2012

Ansar Dine was in peace talks with Mali's neighbours Burkina Faso and Algeria.

January 2013
In late January 2013, during the French Operation Serval against the Islamist fighters in Northern Mali, a faction split off from Ansar Dine, led by Alghabass Ag Intalla(h). It calls itself the Islamic Movement of Azawad (MIA) and claims to be ready for negotiations and to reject extremism and terrorism as well as any association with Al-Qaeda in the Islamic Maghreb.

March 2017
In March 2017, Iyad Ag Ghaly appeared in a video alongside leaders from the Saharan branch of Al-Qaeda in the Islamic Maghreb, Al-Mourabitoun and the Macina Liberation Front, in which it was announced their groups were merging under Ag Ghaly's leadership, in an organisation called Jama'at Nasr al-Islam wal Muslimin.

References

2012 in Mali
Al-Qaeda in the Islamic Maghreb
Azawad
Islamism in Africa
Organizations designated as terrorist by Iraq
Organisations designated as terrorist by the United Kingdom
Organizations designated as terrorist by the United States
Organizations based in Africa designated as terrorist
Rebel groups in Mali
Rebel groups in Algeria
Tuareg
Islamist groups
Jihadist groups
Mali War